This is a list of buildings that are examples of the Art Deco architectural style in Idaho, United States.

Blackfoot 
 Eastern Idaho State Fair Building, Blackfoot
 Nuart Theatre, Blackfoot, 1930
 United States Post Office–Blackfoot Main, Blackfoot, 1936

Boise 
 4531 West Freemont, Boise, 1945
 Ada County Courthouse, Boise
 Banner Bank Building, Boise, 2007
 Baxter Apartment Building, Boise, 1941
 Boise Art Museum, Boise, 1937
 Boise High School Gymnasium, Boise
 Boise Junior High School, Boise, 1937
 Boise Municipal Pool, Boise, 1953
 The Egyptian Theatre, Boise, 1927
 Givens Pursley Building, Boise, 1938
 Hitchcock Building, Boise, 1919 and 1930s
 Hoff Building, Boise, 1930
 Idaho National Guard Armory, Boise, 1931
 Idaho Power Building, Boise, 1932
 John Regan American Legion Hall, Boise, 1939
 Kerhisnik Law Building (former Bruce Budge Medical Building), Boise, 1948
 Lowell Elementary, Boise, 1947
 Morris Hill Cemetery Mausoleum, Boise, 1937
 North Junior High School, Boise, 1937
 Reserve Street Armory, Boise, 1931
 St. Luke's Hospital, Boise, 1902 and 1928
 South Junior High, Boise, 1940s
 Sun Ray Cafe, Boise, 1900s and 1950s
 Veltex Building, Boise, 2002
 Washington Elementary, Boise, 1917 and 1947
 Whittier High School, Boise

Idaho Falls 
 Idaho Falls 5th Ward Meeting House, Idaho Falls, 1939
 Idaho Falls Idaho Temple, Idaho Falls, 1937
 S. H. Kress and Co. Building, Idaho Falls, 1932
 Smith–Hart Building, Idaho Falls

Moscow 
 Moscow High School, Moscow, 1939
 Moscow High School Auditorium, Moscow, 1939
 Nuart Theatre, Moscow, 1935

Other cities 
 Arco City Building, Arco, 1938
 Auditorium Theatre, Pocatello, 1900, 1939
 Bear Lake Middle School, Montpelier, 1937
 Boundary County Courthouse, Bonners Ferry, 1941
 Canyon Springs High School, Caldwell, 1941
 Cassia County Courthouse, Burley, 1939
 City Building and Offices at First and East Center, Pocatello, 1921 and 1940
 Consolidated Wagon/Cain's Furniture Building, Twin Falls, 1909 and 1940s
 Day Rock Bar (former Liberty Theatre), Wallace, 1929
 Depot Sports Bar (former Greyhound Bus Depot), Pocatello, 1946
 Franklin County Courthouse, Preston, 1939
 Gem County Courthouse, Emmett, 1938
 Idaho State University Administration Building, Pocatello, 1939
 Jefferson County Courthouse, Rigby, 1938
 Jerome County Courthouse, Jerome, 1938
 KKOO Radio Station, Weiser, 1947
 L. A. Thomas Memorial Gymnasium, Kimberly, 1941
 Lewis–Clark State College Gymnasium, Lewiston, 1938
 Masonic Hall, Rupert Town Square Historic District, Rupert, 1953
 Oneida County Courthouse, Malad City, 1938
 Orpheum Theater, Twin Falls, 1921
 Owyhee County Courthouse, Murphy, 1936
 Parma Grade School, Parma, 1937
 Priest River Junior High (former High School), Priest River, 1939–1941
 Romance Theater, Rexburg, 1917
 Rupert City Hall, Rupert Town Square Historic District, Rupert, 1937
 Salmon City Hall and Library, Salmon, 1939
 School Gymnasium, Meridian
 Smith's Dairy Products (now Cloverleaf Creamery), Buhl, 1940s
 Star School Building, Star, 1939
 Star Theater, Weiser, 1917 and 1939
 Washington County Courthouse, Weiser, 1938
 United States Post Office, Buhl, 1939
 United States Post Office – Kellogg Main, Kellogg, 1938
 United States Post Office – Orofino Main, Orofino, 1940

See also 
 List of Art Deco architecture
 List of Art Deco architecture in the United States

References 

 "Art Deco & Streamline Moderne Buildings." Roadside Architecture.com. Retrieved 2019-01-03.
 Cinema Treasures. Retrieved 2022-09-06
 "Court House Lover". Flickr. Retrieved 2022-09-06
 "Idaho Architecture Project". Archived from the original on 2018-11-30. Retrieved 2020-02-21.
 "New Deal Map". The Living New Deal. Retrieved 2020-12-25.
 "SAH Archipedia". Society of Architectural Historians. Retrieved 2021-11-21.

External links 
 

Art Deco architecture
Art Deco
Art Deco architecture in the United States
Idaho-related lists